|}

This is a list of electoral district results for the 2006 Victorian state election.

Results by electoral district

Albert Park

Altona

Ballarat East

Ballarat West

Bass

Bayswater

Bellarine

Benalla

Benambra

Bendigo East

Bendigo West

Bentleigh

Box Hill

Brighton

Broadmeadows

Brunswick

Bulleen

Bundoora

Burwood

Carrum

Caulfield

Clayton

Cranbourne

Dandenong

Derrimut

Doncaster

Eltham

Essendon

Evelyn

Ferntree Gully

Footscray

Forest Hill

Frankston

Geelong

Gembrook

Gippsland East

Gippsland South

Hastings

Hawthorn

Ivanhoe

Keilor

Kew

Kilsyth

Kororoit

Lara

Lowan

Lyndhurst

Macedon

Malvern

Melbourne

Melton

Mildura

Mill Park

Mitcham

Monbulk

Mordialloc

Mornington

Morwell

Mount Waverley

Mulgrave

Murray Valley

Narracan

Narre Warren North

Narre Warren South

Nepean

Niddrie

Northcote

Oakleigh

Pascoe Vale

Polwarth

Prahran

Preston

Richmond

Ripon

Rodney

Sandringham

Scoresby

Seymour

Shepparton

South Barwon

South-West Coast

Swan Hill

Tarneit

Thomastown

Warrandyte

Williamstown

Yan Yean

Yuroke

See also 

 2006 Victorian state election
 Candidates of the 2006 Victorian state election
 Members of the Victorian Legislative Assembly, 2006–2010

References 

Results of Victorian state elections
2000s in Victoria (Australia)